Robert Shapland Carew, 1st Baron Carew KP (9 March 1787 – 2 June 1856) was an Irish Whig Party politician and landowner.

He was born in Dublin, the son of Robert Shapland Carew, also an MP and landowner, and his wife Anne (née Pigott). He was educated at Eton College and Christ Church, Oxford. Carew sat as Member of Parliament for County Wexford between 1812 and 1830 and 1831 and 1834 and also served as Lord Lieutenant of County Wexford from 1831 until his death. In 1834 he was raised to the Peerage of Ireland as Baron Carew, of the County of Wexford, and in 1838 he was created Baron Carew, of Castle Boro in the County of Wexford, in the Peerage of the United Kingdom. He was further honoured in 1851 when he was invested a Knight of the Order of St Patrick.

Lord Carew married, on 16 November 1816, Jane Catherine Cliffe (1798–1901), daughter of Major Anthony Cliffe and Frances Deane.  They had three sons and a daughter:
 Hon. Anne Dorothea Carew (1822–1909), married John Davies Gilbert.
 Hon. Ellen Jane Carew (1824–1902), married Charles Glynn Prideaux-Brune.
 Sir Robert Shapland Carew, 2nd Baron Carew (1818–1881).
 Hon. Shapland Francis Carew (1827–1892).

Lord Carew died in June 1856, aged 69, and was succeeded in his titles by his eldest son Robert. Lady Carew died at Woodstown, Co. Waterford 12 November 1901, aged 103.

Notes

References
Kidd, Charles & Williamson, David (eds.) (1990) Debrett's Peerage and Baronetage (1990 edition). New York: St Martin's Press,

External links 
 

1787 births
1856 deaths
Alumni of Christ Church, Oxford
Peers of Ireland created by William IV
Peers of the United Kingdom created by Queen Victoria
Knights of St Patrick
Lord-Lieutenants of Wexford
Members of the Parliament of the United Kingdom for County Wexford constituencies (1801–1922)
People educated at Eton College
UK MPs 1812–1818
UK MPs 1818–1820
UK MPs 1820–1826
UK MPs 1826–1830
UK MPs 1831–1832
UK MPs 1832–1835
UK MPs who were granted peerages
Robert 1